Khin Yi is a Burmese politician who served as Minister of Immigration and Population from March 2011 to August 2015 and again from August 2021 to August 2022 as well as  Chief of the Myanmar Police Force from April 2002 to March 2011. He has served as Chairman of the Union Solidarity and Development Party in acting capacity from September to October 2022 and official capacity since October 2022 as well as Vice Chairman of the party from December 2019 to his official promotion to the party chairmanship in October 2022. He is widely regarded as a close ally of Min Aung Hlaing, Chairman of the State Administration Council, the Prime Minister and the Commander-in-chief of Defence Services.

Early life and education
Khin Yi was born on 29 December 1952. He graduated from the 17th intake is the Defence Services Academy.

Career
He ordered the bloody crackdown on protesters at the Saffron Revolution, later became Immigration Minister in Thein Sein's quasi-civilian government and again in the military junta Min Aung Hlaing's cabinet.

References

People from Ayeyarwady Region
Government ministers of Myanmar
Burmese military personnel
1952 births
Living people
Defence Services Academy alumni